Abu ʿAbd Allāh Muḥammad ibn ʿAlī ibn Ḥammād ibn ʿĪsā ibn ʿAbī Bakr al-Ṣanhāj̲ī, known as Ibn Ḥammād or Ibn Ḥamādu (1153/54–1230 / AH 548–628), was a medieval Berber qadi and historian, author of a chronicle on the Fatimid caliphs in the Maghreb, known as  ("account of the kings of the house of Ubaid and their deeds"), written in 1220 / AH 617.
He was related to the Banu Hammad and a native of a village near their Qal'a.

Editions
Histoires des Rois Obaidides, ed. and trans.   M. Vanderyheiden, Paris, 1927.
Akhbar muluk Bani Ubayd wa-siratuhum: Tahlil li-tarikh al-Dawlah al-Fatimiyah min khilal masdar turathi , Dar al-Ulum, 1981,

See also
Muslim conquest of the Maghreb

Notes

References
J. F. P. Hopkins, Nehemia Levtzion, Corpus of early Arabic sources for West African history, Markus Wiener Publishers, 2000, ., p. 154.

1150s births
1230 deaths
12th-century Berber people
13th-century Berber people
Berber historians
Hammadids
Sanhaja
13th-century historians of the medieval Islamic world